is a trans-Neptunian object and centaur from the scattered disk and Inner Oort cloud approximately 30 kilometers in diameter.

Possible comet

With an absolute magnitude (H) of 10.8 and an unknown albedo, the object has an estimated diameter of 15–40 km. Since it has not been seen out-gassing, it is not known if it is a comet or not. It might also be a damocloid, a type of minor planet that was originally a comet but lost most of its near-surface volatile materials after numerous orbits around the Sun. It also might be a dormant comet that simply has not been seen outgassing.

Orbit

 came to perihelion 8.3 AU from the Sun on 27 October 2012, when it reached an apparent magnitude of about 20. In 1927, when it was 100 AU from the Sun, it had an apparent magnitude of about 30.8. For comparison dwarf planet 90377 Sedna had an apparent magnitude of 21.7 when it was 100 AU from the Sun. It comes to opposition at the start of September.

It will not be 50 AU from the Sun until 2045. After leaving the planetary region of the Solar System,  will have a barycentric aphelion of 1920 AU with an orbital period of 29900 years.

The orbit of  currently comes closer to Saturn than any of the other giant planets. In a 10 million year integration of the orbit, the nominal (best-fit) orbit acquires a perihelion point of 0.5 AU (inside the orbit of Venus), and one of the 3-sigma clones acquires a perihelion point of only .

 travels in a technically retrograde orbit around the Sun. It is actually orbiting in a plane nearly perpendicular to that of the ecliptic. It has the 55th highest inclination of any known asteroid, after  and before .

Comparison

Largest semimajor axes of minor planets

Notes

References

External links 
 Webcite archive of Epoch 2015-06-27 with aphelion (Q) of 2467 AU
 
 

Damocloids

Inner Oort cloud
Trans-Neptunian objects
Minor planet object articles (unnumbered)
20130110
Minor planets with a retrograde orbit